Joe Thornalley, known professionally as Vegyn, is a British music producer, DJ and graphic designer. He is known for his production work on Frank Ocean's Blonde and Endless. In 2019, he released a 90-minute mixtape titled Text While Driving If You Want To Meet God!. Later that year, he released his debut studio album Only Diamonds Cut Diamonds featuring guest appearances from rappers JPEGMafia, Retro X, and Jeshi.

Career
Vegyn was born in London. His mother worked as a graphic designer and his father is musician and songwriter Phil Thornalley. He began performing in 2013 while studying design at the London College of Communication teaching himself how to make boom bap beats after encouragement from fellow musicians. He later left university to focus on music  and created the electronic music label PLZ Make It Ruins, which released his debut extended play All Bad Things Have Ended – Your Lunch Included and the compilation tape PLZ Vol. 1 featuring underground London producers.

Around the same time, he met fellow music producer James Blake during a 1-800 Dinosaur event at the now-closed London nightclub Plastic People. Vegyn gave him a USB of songs he had made under the Vegyn moniker. Blake later played these songs on BBC Radio in 2014.

Vegyn met Frank Ocean at the Plastic People club and was flown out to do production work on Ocean's studio albums Blonde and Endless. He also hosted Ocean's Blonded Radio in 2017 and played one of his PREP+ nights in New York in 2019.
Vegyn has since contributed to albums such as Aminé's Good for You, Travis Scott's Astroworld and JPEGMafia's All My Heroes Are Cornballs.

In 2019, he released the 71 track mixtape Text While Driving If You Want To Meet God! and his debut studio album Only Diamonds Cut Diamonds.

Discography

Albums

References

English electronic musicians
English record producers
Living people
1993 births